Billy Richard Olson (born July 19, 1958) is a retired American Olympic pole vaulter who held several world records, including the first 19-foot indoor pole vault. Olson finished 12th at the 1988 Summer Olympics, and was to have been part of the U.S. team for the boycotted 1980 Summer Olympics.

Olson vaulted for Abilene High School and Abilene Christian University, from which he graduated.  He was Inducted into the Texas Track and Field Coaches Hall of Fame, Class of 2012.

References

External links

1958 births
Living people
American male pole vaulters
Olympic track and field athletes of the United States
Sportspeople from Abilene, Texas
Track and field athletes from Texas
Athletes (track and field) at the 1988 Summer Olympics
Abilene Christian Wildcats men's track and field athletes